Beyblade Burst Rise, known in Japan as  is a 2019-2020 original net animation series and the fourth season of Beyblade Burst. The series consists of 52 12-minute episodes, and they premiered on the CoroCoro and Takara Tomy YouTube channels starting April 5, 2019. The Japanese release of this season has the 52 episodes standalone while the international release combines two episodes together to make 26 24-minute episodes. It aired in India from November 7, 2022 to November 23, 2022 on Disney Channel.

The series was animated by OLM. D-rights produced the first 27 episodes and the rest were produced by ADK Emotions, a wholly-owned subsidiary of Asatsu-DK formed after it acquired the entirety of d-rights. An English dub of the anime premiered on Disney XD in the United States on February 8, 2020.

The opening theme for the season is "Gatti'n'Roll!" by Kei Iwasaki and the ending theme is the instrumental version of "Gatti'n'Roll!" The English theme for the season is "Rise Rise Beyblade Burst" by Jonathan Young; an instrumental version is used for the credits. 



Episode list

References

External links
 Beyblade Burst Rise profile at d-rights
 Beyblade Burst GT on Corocoro 
 Beyblade Burst GT on Takara Tomy YouTube channel  (access limited)

Burst Season 4
2019 anime ONAs
2019 Japanese television seasons
2020 Japanese television seasons